`The 12th Filmfare Awards were held in 1965.

Sangam led the ceremony with 11 nominations, followed by Dosti with 7 nominations.

Dosti won 6 awards, including Best Film and Best Music Director (Laxmikant–Pyarelal), thus becoming the most-awarded film at the ceremony.

Awards

Best Film
 Dosti 
Sangam
Shehar Aur Sapna

Best Director
 Raj Kapoor – Sangam 
K.A. Abbas – Shehar Aur Sapna
Satyen Bose – Dosti

Best Actor
 Dilip Kumar – Leader 
Raj Kapoor – Sangam
Rajendra Kumar – Ayee Milan Ki Bela

Best Actress
 Vyjayanthimala – Sangam 
Sadhana – Woh Kaun Thi?
Mala Sinha – Jahan Ara

Best Supporting Actor
 Nana Palsikar – Shehar Aur Sapna 
Dharmendra – Ayee Milan Ki Bela
Rajendra Kumar – Sangam

Best Supporting Actress
 Nirupa Roy – Shehnai 
Lalita Pawar – Kohraa
Shashikala – Ayee Milan Ki Bela

Best Story
 Dosti – Bani Bhatt 
Sangam – Inder Raj Anand
Shehar Aur Sapna – K.A. Abbas

Best Dialogue
 Dosti – Govind Moonis

Best Music Director 
 Dosti – Laxmikant–Pyarelal 
Woh Kaun Thi? – Madan Mohan
Sangam – Shankar-Jaikishan

Best Lyricist
 Dosti – Majrooh Sultanpuri for Chahoonga Main Tujhe 
Sangam – Shailendra for Dost Dost Naa Raha
Sant Gyaneshwar – Bharat Vyas for Jyot Se Jyot Jagate Chalo

Best Playback Singer
 Dosti – Mohammad Rafi for Chahoonga Main Tujhe 
Sangam – Mukesh for Dost Dost Naa Raha
Sant Gyaneshwar – Lata Mangeshkar for Jyot Jyot Se Jagate

Best Art Direction, B&W
 Kohraa

Best Art Direction, Color
 Jahan Ara

Best Cinematography, B&W
 Woh Kaun Thi?

Best Cinematography, Color
 Geet Gaya Pattharon Ne

Best Editing
 Sangam

Best Sound
 Sangam

Biggest Winners
Dosti – 6/7
Sangam – 4/11

See also
14th Filmfare Awards
13th Filmfare Awards
Filmfare Awards

References
https://www.imdb.com/event/ev0000245/1965/

Filmfare Awards
Filmfare
1964 in Indian cinema